Qezel Qaleh-ye Musulanlu (also Romanized as Qezel Qal‘eh-ye Mūsūlānlū; also known as Qezel Qal‘eh) is a village in Charuymaq-e Jonubegharbi Rural District, in the Central District of Charuymaq County, East Azerbaijan Province, Iran. At the 2006 census, its population was 216, in 38 families.

References 

Populated places in Charuymaq County